Green wood is unseasoned wood.

Greenwood or Green wood may also refer to:

People 
 Greenwood (surname)

Settlements

Australia 
 Greenwood, Queensland, a locality in the Toowoomba Region
 Greenwood, Western Australia, a suburb of Perth

Canada 
 Greenwood, Calgary, Alberta, a neighbourhood
 Greenwood, British Columbia, a city
 Greenwood, Nova Scotia, a village
 Greenwood, Halifax County, Nova Scotia, a community in the Halifax Regional Municipality
 Greenwood, Durham Regional Municipality, Ontario
 Greenwood, Renfrew County, Ontario

United States 
 Greenwood, Arizona
 Greenwood, Arkansas
 Greenwood, El Dorado County, California
 Greenwood, Glenn County, California
 Greenwood, former name of Elk, Mendocino County, California
 Greenwood Village, Colorado, a city
 Greenwood, Delaware
 Greenwood, Florida
 Greenwood, Georgia
 Greenwood, Idaho
 Greenwood, Illinois
 Mount Greenwood, Chicago, Illinois
 Greenwood, Indiana
 Greenwood, Wayne County, Indiana
 Greenwood, Wells County, Indiana
 Greenwood, Louisville, Kentucky
 Greenwood, former name of Erlanger, Kentucky
 Greenwood, Louisiana
 Greenwood, Maine
 Greenwood, Massachusetts
 Greenwood, Marquette County, Michigan
 Greenwood, Minnesota
 Greenwood, Mississippi micropolitan area
 Greenwood, Mississippi
 Greenwood Springs, Mississippi
 Greenwood, Missouri
 Greenwood, Nebraska
 Greenwood, New York
 Greenwood, Tulsa, Oklahoma
 Greenwood, Pennsylvania
 Greenwood, Franklin County, Pennsylvania
 Greenwood, South Carolina
 Greenwood, Charles Mix County, South Dakota
 Greenwood, Lawrence County, South Dakota
 Greenwood, Clarksville, Tennessee
 Greenwood, Midland County, Texas 
 Greenwood, Parker County, Texas 
 Greenwood, Wise County, Texas 
 Greenwood, Albemarle County, Virginia
 Greenwood, Bath County, Virginia
 Greenwood, Washington
 Greenwood, Seattle, Washington
 Greenwood, Boone County, West Virginia
 Greenwood, Doddridge County, West Virginia
 Greenwood, Fayette County, West Virginia
 Greenwood, Morgan County, West Virginia
 Greenwood, Wisconsin, a city in Clark County
 Greenwood, Taylor County, Wisconsin, a town
 Greenwood, Vernon County, Wisconsin, a town
 Greenwood (community), Vernon County, Wisconsin, an unincorporated community

Electoral districts
 Greenwood (electoral district), a former federal district in Ontario
 Greenwood (Ontario electoral district), a defunct provincial riding
 Greenwood (British Columbia electoral district), British Columbia

Historic buildings
 Greenwood (Columbia, Missouri), a house
 Greenwood (Fayette, Missouri), also known as the Estill-Parrish House
 Greenwood (Memphis, Tennessee), also known as Beverly Hall, a mansion
 Greenwood (Culpeper, Virginia), a plantation house
 Greenwood (Orange, Virginia), a house
 Greenwood Elementary School (Terre Haute, Indiana)
 Greenwood Museum, Smyrna, New York

Other uses
 Greenwood (bank), an American digital bank
 Greenwood Branch, a river in New Jersey
Greenwood International, a timber trader from The Netherlands
 Greenwood Publishing Group
 Greenwood Raceway, a defunct harness horse-racing track in Toronto
 Greenwood Terrace, a public housing estate in Chai Wan, Hong Kong
 CFB Greenwood, an RCAF/Canadian Forces base located near the village of Greenwood
 GreenWood, an amusement park in Wales
 Green Wood Centre, Shropshire, formerly the Greenwood Trust, a centre for the coppice revival
 "Greenwood", a song by Peter, Paul and Mary from the 1986 album No Easy Walk to Freedom

See also 
 Greenwood Academy (disambiguation)
 Greenwood Cemetery (disambiguation)
 Greenwood College School, a day school in Toronto, Ontario
 Greenwood County (disambiguation)
 Greenwood Farm (disambiguation)
 Greenwood High School (disambiguation)
 Greenwood Lake (disambiguation)
 Greenwood River (disambiguation)
 Greenwood station (disambiguation)
 Greenwood Township (disambiguation)
 Greenwoods, a menswear store chain